Gebe is an island in Maluku Islands, Indonesia. Administratively it is part of Central Halmahera, North Maluku.

The island is part of a small island group which also include Fau island, Yoi, Uta, and Sain.

Gebe is part of the Halmahera rain forests ecoregion. The Gebe cuscus (Phalanger alexandrae), an arboreal marsupial, is endemic to the island.

The island lies directly on the equator

Reference

Islands of the Maluku Islands